Mocache Canton is a canton of Ecuador, located in the Los Ríos Province.  Its capital is the town of Mocache.  Its population at the 2001 census was 33,481.

Demographics
Ethnic groups as of the Ecuadorian census of 2010:
Montubio  72.5%
Mestizo  22.1%
Afro-Ecuadorian  3.0%
White  1.8%
Indigenous  0.5%
Other  0.1%

References

Cantons of Los Ríos Province